The Shelekhov Constituency (No.95) is a Russian legislative constituency in Irkutsk Oblast. It was previously located in western Irkutsk Oblast as Tulun constituency in 1993-2003. After Irkutsk Oblast lost one of its four constituencies prior to the 2003 election, Tulun constituency was absorbed into Angarsk constituency. A western Irkutsk Oblast-based constituency was recreated in 2016 as Shelekhov constituency but in its current configuration it stretches from the city of Irkutsk to Tulun and Tayshet along the oblast's southern border.

Members elected

Election results

1993

|-
! colspan=2 style="background-color:#E9E9E9;text-align:left;vertical-align:top;" |Candidate
! style="background-color:#E9E9E9;text-align:left;vertical-align:top;" |Party
! style="background-color:#E9E9E9;text-align:right;" |Votes
! style="background-color:#E9E9E9;text-align:right;" |%
|-
|style="background-color:"|
|align=left|Anatoly Turusin
|align=left|Agrarian Party
|84,656
|38.14%
|-
|style="background-color:"|
|align=left|Mikhail Stupin
|align=left|Independent
| -
|18.58%
|-
| colspan="5" style="background-color:#E9E9E9;"|
|- style="font-weight:bold"
| colspan="3" style="text-align:left;" | Total
| 221,933
| 100%
|-
| colspan="5" style="background-color:#E9E9E9;"|
|- style="font-weight:bold"
| colspan="4" |Source:
|
|}

1995

|-
! colspan=2 style="background-color:#E9E9E9;text-align:left;vertical-align:top;" |Candidate
! style="background-color:#E9E9E9;text-align:left;vertical-align:top;" |Party
! style="background-color:#E9E9E9;text-align:right;" |Votes
! style="background-color:#E9E9E9;text-align:right;" |%
|-
|style="background-color:"|
|align=left|Anatoly Turusin (incumbent)
|align=left|Agrarian Party
|109,193
|39.03%
|-
|style="background-color:"|
|align=left|Sergey Kudryavtsev
|align=left|Liberal Democratic Party
|52,006
|18.59%
|-
|style="background-color:"|
|align=left|Vladimir Ganzha
|align=left|Independent
|43,965
|15.72%
|-
|style="background-color:#324194"|
|align=left|Leonid Chernyshov
|align=left|Union of Workers of ZhKKh
|30,663
|10.96%
|-
|style="background-color:#000000"|
|colspan=2 |against all
|39,169
|14.00%
|-
| colspan="5" style="background-color:#E9E9E9;"|
|- style="font-weight:bold"
| colspan="3" style="text-align:left;" | Total
| 279,749
| 100%
|-
| colspan="5" style="background-color:#E9E9E9;"|
|- style="font-weight:bold"
| colspan="4" |Source:
|
|}

1999

|-
! colspan=2 style="background-color:#E9E9E9;text-align:left;vertical-align:top;" |Candidate
! style="background-color:#E9E9E9;text-align:left;vertical-align:top;" |Party
! style="background-color:#E9E9E9;text-align:right;" |Votes
! style="background-color:#E9E9E9;text-align:right;" |%
|-
|style="background-color:"|
|align=left|Sergey Kolesnikov
|align=left|Independent
|112,159
|44.79%
|-
|style="background-color:"|
|align=left|Anatoly Turusin (incumbent)
|align=left|Communist Party
|42,274
|16.88%
|-
|style="background-color:"|
|align=left|Aleksandr Gamayunov
|align=left|Independent
|17,482
|6.98%
|-
|style="background-color:"|
|align=left|Ivan Zelent
|align=left|Independent
|12,869
|5.14%
|-
|style="background-color:#084284"|
|align=left|Aleksandr Tolstoukhov
|align=left|Spiritual Heritage
|10,415
|4.16%
|-
|style="background-color:"|
|align=left|Yury Gurtovoy
|align=left|Independent
|9,380
|3.75%
|-
|style="background-color:"|
|align=left|Nikolay Kuryanovich
|align=left|Liberal Democratic Party
|8,130
|3.25%
|-
|style="background-color:"|
|align=left|Yury Zolotukhin
|align=left|Yabloko
|6,539
|2.61%
|-
|style="background-color:"|
|align=left|Anatoly Dubas
|align=left|Independent
|5,141
|2.05%
|-
|style="background-color:#FF4400"|
|align=left|Sergey Smolich
|align=left|Andrey Nikolayev and Svyatoslav Fyodorov Bloc
|924
|0.37%
|-
|style="background-color:#000000"|
|colspan=2 |against all
|21,073
|8.42%
|-
| colspan="5" style="background-color:#E9E9E9;"|
|- style="font-weight:bold"
| colspan="3" style="text-align:left;" | Total
| 250,402
| 100%
|-
| colspan="5" style="background-color:#E9E9E9;"|
|- style="font-weight:bold"
| colspan="4" |Source:
|
|}

2016

|-
! colspan=2 style="background-color:#E9E9E9;text-align:left;vertical-align:top;" |Candidate
! style="background-color:#E9E9E9;text-align:left;vertical-align:top;" |Party
! style="background-color:#E9E9E9;text-align:right;" |Votes
! style="background-color:#E9E9E9;text-align:right;" |%
|-
|style="background-color:"|
|align=left|Sergey Ten
|align=left|United Russia
|72,660
|42.34%
|-
|style="background-color:"|
|align=left|Anton Romanov
|align=left|Communist Party
|31,494
|18.35%
|-
|style="background-color:"|
|align=left|Ivan Grachev
|align=left|Party of Growth
|20,033
|11.67%
|-
|style="background-color:"|
|align=left|Dmitry Yershov
|align=left|Liberal Democratic Party
|12,089
|7.04%
|-
|style="background:"| 
|align=left|Leonid Karnaukhov
|align=left|Communists of Russia
|6,602
|3.85%
|-
|style="background-color:"|
|align=left|Georgy Komarov
|align=left|A Just Russia
|5,074
|2.96%
|-
|style="background-color:"|
|align=left|Vladimir Alekseyev
|align=left|Yabloko
|4,766
|2.78%
|-
|style="background:"| 
|align=left|Mikhail Vasilyev
|align=left|People's Freedom Party
|3,543
|2.06%
|-
|style="background-color:"|
|align=left|Nikolay Chumak
|align=left|Rodina
|3,284
|1.91%
|-
|style="background: "| 
|align=left|Yury Yelokhin
|align=left|The Greens
|1,888
|1.10%
|-
|style="background:"| 
|align=left|Nikolay Ignatyev
|align=left|Civic Platform
|1,651
|0.96%
|-
|style="background:"| 
|align=left|Vasily Pronichev
|align=left|Patriots of Russia
|1,442
|0.84%
|-
|style="background:#00A650"| 
|align=left|Nikolay Kostyukov
|align=left|Civilian Power
|610
|0.36%
|-
| colspan="5" style="background-color:#E9E9E9;"|
|- style="font-weight:bold"
| colspan="3" style="text-align:left;" | Total
| 171,692
| 100%
|-
| colspan="5" style="background-color:#E9E9E9;"|
|- style="font-weight:bold"
| colspan="4" |Source:
|
|}

2021

|-
! colspan=2 style="background-color:#E9E9E9;text-align:left;vertical-align:top;" |Candidate
! style="background-color:#E9E9E9;text-align:left;vertical-align:top;" |Party
! style="background-color:#E9E9E9;text-align:right;" |Votes
! style="background-color:#E9E9E9;text-align:right;" |%
|-
|style="background-color:"|
|align=left|Sergey Ten (incumbent)
|align=left|United Russia
|70,071
|40.56%
|-
|style="background-color:"|
|align=left|Viktor Kondrashov
|align=left|Communist Party
|37,873
|21.92%
|-
|style="background-color:"|
|align=left|Maksim Devochkin
|align=left|Liberal Democratic Party
|15,181
|8.79%
|-
|style="background-color:"|
|align=left|Sergey Kondratyev
|align=left|Communists of Russia
|10,977
|6.35%
|-
|style="background-color:"|
|align=left|Ivan Savushkin
|align=left|New People
|9,514
|5.51%
|-
|style="background-color: "|
|align=left|Grigory Krasovsky
|align=left|Party of Pensioners
|5,472
|3.17%
|-
|style="background-color: " |
|align=left|Dmitry Didenov
|align=left|A Just Russia — For Truth
|4,719
|2.73%
|-
|style="background:"| 
|align=left|Yelena Stepanova
|align=left|The Greens
|3,228
|1.87%
|-
|style="background-color:"|
|align=left|Ilya Artemyev
|align=left|Party of Growth
|2,988
|1.73%
|-
|style="background:"| 
|align=left|Grigory Vakulenko
|align=left|Civic Platform
|2,025
|1.17%
|-
|style="background-color:"|
|align=left|Anna Shlomina
|align=left|Yabloko
|1,956
|1.13%
|-
| colspan="5" style="background-color:#E9E9E9;"|
|- style="font-weight:bold"
| colspan="3" style="text-align:left;" | Total
| 172,741
| 100%
|-
| colspan="5" style="background-color:#E9E9E9;"|
|- style="font-weight:bold"
| colspan="4" |Source:
|
|}

Notes

References

Russian legislative constituencies
Politics of Irkutsk Oblast